A partial lunar eclipse took place on Saturday, August 26, 1961, the second of two partial lunar eclipses in 1961. This nearly total lunar eclipse of Saros cycle 137 preceded the first total eclipse on September 6, 1979. It took place around lunar perigee, therefore as a result, the Moon appeared larger than usual. It was the largest partial lunar eclipse since October 28, 1939, making it the second largest partial lunar eclipse of the 20th century.

Visibility

Related lunar eclipses

Lunar year series

Saros series
It is part of Saros series 137.

Tritos series 
 Preceded: Lunar eclipse of September 26, 1950

 Followed: Lunar eclipse of July 26, 1972

Tzolkinex 
 Preceded: Lunar eclipse of July 16, 1954

 Followed: Lunar eclipse of October 6, 1968

See also
List of lunar eclipses
List of 20th-century lunar eclipses

Notes

External links

1961-08
1961 in science
August 1961 events